Blondi tuli taloon (The Blonde Came to the House) is a Finnish television series. It first aired on Finnish TV in 1994 and last aired in 1995.

See also
List of Finnish television series

External links
 

Finnish television shows
1994 Finnish television series debuts
1995 Finnish television series endings
1990s Finnish television series
MTV3 original programming